Starbright Asthma CD-ROM Game: Quest for the Code is an  interactive asthma adventure game developed by Starbright. The game is available in both English and Spanish and free to both children with asthma and their carers. The game was designed for educational purposes.

Originally developed as a CD-ROM game for use in schools, it was later made available online for free for use by parents, teachers, and students.

It was part of a series including Starbright Diabetes CD-Rom, Starbright Explorer Series, and Starbright Hospital Pals.

Production and release 
In May 2002, The Starlight Children's Foundation, chaired by Steven Spielberg and General H. Norman Schwarzkopf announced the educational CD-Rom. It was developed using input of an advisory team of national pediatric asthma experts. The making, funding and distribution of "Quest" was assisted by Home Shopping Network, Technicolor, Ivy Hill Corp., ImagEngine Corp. and GlaxoSmithKline, and it was described as "widely distributed".  It was made available for free at the National Library of Medicine's Virtual Asthma Exhibit. In November 2002, the developers received a grant from the Centers for Disease Control and Prevention's (CDC) adolescent and school health program, allowing them to distribute the game to school nurses at more than 30,000 elementary, middle and high schools free of charge. Due to a grant from The California Endowment, the game was included in a distributed Asthma Tool Kit. In 2007, Starlight converted the game to a web-based platform.

Gameplay and plot
While play throughout the levels are in general linear, players are given two to three decision-making checkpoints that affect elements of the narrative. An Implementation guide was packaged with some versions that gave teachers tips on how to integrate the game into school learning.

Cast 
The game features many celebrities in roles:

 Cuba Gooding, Jr. as your guide, Cyrus
 Diane Sawyer as “The Newscaster”
 Kelsey Grammer as Mucus Airgon, leader of the Evil Seven
 General H. Norman Schwarzkopf as Robo-Roach
 Whoopi Goldberg as Moldy
 Funkmaster Flex as Mold Mob game announcer
 Jeff Goldblum as Alex Dander
 Shaquille O’Neal as The Fuminator
 Glenn Close as Chalktisha
 Gwyneth Paltrow as Perfuma
 Minnie Driver as Smokita

Critical reception 
A paper from Syracuse University found that the game was promising in empowering those living with asthma and their families to take control of the disease. A paper from Arizona State University found the game to "be an effective tool for asthma education in a classroom setting". Practitioner Eleanor Thornton wrote that the game offered a "truly interactive, inexpensive game" experience that was lacking in her resources.

See also 
Starbright World

References

External links 
  (archived)
 Starbright game series at Starbright.org (archived)

2002 video games
Children's educational video games
Medical video games
Video games developed in the United States
Windows games
Windows-only games
Works about asthma